The Warrior is a 2001 film by British filmmaker Asif Kapadia. It stars Irrfan Khan as Lafcadia, a warrior in feudal Rajasthan who attempts to give up the sword. The film is in Hindi and was filmed in Rajasthan, India. The film is credited with convincing Irrfan Khan to not give up on his acting career.

The Warrior is the story of spiritual transformation of a cruel warrior Lafcadia. The movie unfolds taking you from Rajasthan to the Himalayas. Kapadia started work on the 2001 film within a year of graduating from the Royal College of Art. Even though this was his first feature film, The Warrior was produced by companies from the UK, Germany and France. At the BAFTA Awards it won the Alexander Korda Award for Best British Film. 

It was also one of the films, short-listed for UK's official entry for the Academy Award for Best Foreign Language Film but was ultimately dropped on grounds that the language was not indigenous to Britain. Britain's official Oscar selection and eventual nominee was the Welsh-language film Solomon and Gaenor.

Plot 
Lafcadia(Irrfan Khan) is a warrior who serves a ruthless and merciless tyrant in desert plains of feudal India. He leads a band of other warriors loyal to their lord. He lives with his son a young boy who one day while playing meets a little girl. She is the daughter of a travelling cloth merchant woman who arrive at the village for trading. The girl makes him her honorary brother by tying a Rakhi(sacred thread tied by sisters around their brothers' wrists) to him. In return, he gifts his amulet to her. One day, the lord, angered by the failure of a village to pay the harvest tax, orders Lafcadia and his band to raze the village. His sword-wielding and horse-riding men enter the village and begin to burn it down, pillage it and massacre the inhabitants. Lafcadia attempts to kill a girl trying to flee with her mother but stops when he spots his son's amulet around her neck ( she was the same girl who had met his son). It reminds him of his own child and makes him realise the barbarity of his deeds. He also has a brief vision of his ancestral homeland situated in the Himalayas. He spares the life of the girl and her mother. Guilt-ridden and remorseful, he decides to renounce his role as a warrior and return to his homeland in the mountains with his son in search of solace. The lord, on learning about this, feels betrayed and orders Lafcadia's second-in-command (who is eager to replace him) to kill him and bring his severed head by the next morning. Lafcadia evades capture but his son gets caught. The commander, takes the head of some other man who resembles Lafcadia and coerces Lafcadia's son to identify it as that of his father to trick the lord. Lafcadia, disguised as a peasant, enters the palace gathering, hiding in a crowd of villagers, to save his son but his son is murdered by the commander while he watches from a distance helplessly in the crowd unable to do anything. He is temporarily immobilised due to the trauma of witnessing his only child's death and is saved by the palace blacksmith, a kind man who transports him far enough from the palace. Lafcadia, now on his own, begins the journey to his homeland on foot. The commander, who has now replaced Lafcadia as the band leader, is still paranoid that Lafcadia might come after him to avenge his son's murder. He embarks on a manhunt to kill Lafcadia. On his way, Lafcadia meets an orphaned thief, a young man whose parents were killed in one of the village raids of Lafcadia's band when he was a kid. Unaware of Lafcadia's true identity, he befriends him but gets suspicious of him when he observes scars on his body and the villagers who recognise him and are scared of him. Nevertheless, he accompanies him throughout the journey. They meet an old blind woman who possesses psychic abilities and wants to pay a visit to the holy lake in the mountains. They meet a travelling cart driver who agrees to give them a ride. As they reach the mountains, they learn that a band of warriors have occupied a nearby village and are waiting for someone. Lafcadia heads to the village to confront them. The orphaned boy's suspicions are confirmed and he learns that Lafcadia used to be a warrior and is likely the murderer of his parents as well. The boy is initially distraught and parts ways with him but understands that he is remorseful and has changed. Lafcadia reaches the occupied village deserted by its inhabitants. The commander mocks him and tries to kill him but is stealthily attacked by the boy who had been secretly following Lafcadia. Lafcadia gets hold of the commander and slits his throat killing him. Lafcadia and the boy have food at a local restaurant run by a woman and her daughter. The boy is hired by the woman as a waiter fulfilling his dream of having a house, food and family. Lafcadia while climbing a snowy hill collapses and wakes up in the cabin of the same little girl who had received his son's amulet. Her mother cooks him food and gives him warm clothes. Lafcadia while departing the cabin located in the same landscape as he had seen in his vision earlier, understands the deeper meaning of his vision and destiny. The blind old woman is shown worshipping at the holy lake and the movie ends with a scenic view of the mountains.

Cast 
Irrfan Khan as Lafcadia
Aino Annuddin as Biswas
Noor Mani as an orphaned thief
Damayanti Marfatia as a blind woman

Release
As pre-publicity the director attended a Q&A screening in Wood Green's Cineworld Cinema, commenting that it was good to be back at the shopping centre where he had spent so much time hanging out as a teenager.

Festival screenings include: London, Edinburgh, Rotterdam, Pusan, Gothenburg, Boston.

References

External links
 
 

2001 films
2000s action adventure films
2000s Hindi-language films
British action adventure films
French action adventure films
German action adventure films
Films directed by Asif Kapadia
Films scored by Dario Marianelli
Films set in the Middle Ages
Films set in Rajasthan
Films shot in Rajasthan
Best British Film BAFTA Award winners
2001 directorial debut films
2000s British films
2000s French films
2000s German films